Seonam Lake Park is an urban park next to Hamwolsan in Seonam-dong, Nam-gu, Ulsan, South Korea. The park was previously named Sunam Dam Park because of the large C-shaped dammed lake in the center of the park. It takes approximately one hour to walk the trails around the lake. There are additional trails that wind through the mountains that surround the lake. One such trail leads to 3 miniature places of worship, including the 1.8-meter tall "An min temple", the 1.8 m tall "Lake Church", and the 1.5 m tall replica of St. Peter's Basilica.

History 
The park was built by the Korean Water Corporation in 1964 to supply water to adjacent industry by extending Seonam Pond. Public access was not allowed until 2007 when the lake was remodeled, and renamed Seonam Lake Park.

See also 
 
 List of South Korean tourist attractions
 Ulsan Grand Park

References

External links 

 Official site for Korea tourism

Parks in Ulsan
Nam District, Ulsan
Urban public parks
1964 establishments in South Korea
20th-century architecture in South Korea